Derek Vernon Brown (born March 31, 1970 in Falls Church, Virginia) is a former American football tight end in the National Football League.

College Football Career
He played college football at Notre Dame and attended high school at Merritt Island High School.  In his final two seasons at Notre Dame, he displayed receiving prowess with 37 catches for 545 yards and 5 TD.

NFL career
He was drafted 14th overall in the 1992 NFL Draft by the New York Giants.  As a rookie, he recorded 4 catches for 31 yards and followed that season up with 7 catches for 56 yards in 1993.  In 1994, Brown mostly played a role on special teams.

He was selected by the Jacksonville Jaguars in the 1995 NFL Expansion Draft.  Brown missed the entire 1995 season as the result of a hit from Denver Broncos safety Tim Hauck during a preseason game. He suffered bruised ribs, a collapsed lung and damage to his spleen and kidney. He was in the hospital for 10 days and in a wheelchair a few weeks after that.  Despite the injuries, his best season came in 1996 with the Jacksonville Jaguars when he recorded 17 catches for 141 yards.  He followed it up in 1997 with 8 catches for 84 yards and one touchdown.  In 1998, he went to the Oakland Raiders where he started 4 games and recorded 7 catches for 89 yards.

Post Football Life
Brown now resides in Clifton Park, New York with his daughter, Sydney, and his son, Reece.
He currently works as a senior energy advisor at GREENCROWN Energy & Water and as the director of operations at Jersey Mikes

References

1970 births
Living people
Sportspeople from Fairfax, Virginia
American football tight ends
Notre Dame Fighting Irish football players
New York Giants players
Jacksonville Jaguars players
Oakland Raiders players
Arizona Cardinals players
Ed Block Courage Award recipients